Eidsvoll Church (Norwegian: Eidsvoll Kirke) is a  cruciform church from c. 1190 in Eidsvoll, Viken in Norway.  The Romanesque building is of stone and probably one of the first  cruciform stone churches to be built in Norway. Close to Eidsvoll Church there is an ancient sunken lane that was used as a path far into the last century.
Eidsvoll Church is listed and protected by law by the Norwegian Directorate for Cultural Heritage.

History
The church building has repeatedly been affected by fire and rebuilt. After the last major fire in 1883, the church was partly rebuilt in bricks.  
In 1678, Johannes Skraastad  (1648-1700) made an altarpiece for the church.  This altarpiece was presumably lost in the fire in 1762. The altarpiece that is in the church dates from 1765 and  consists three oil paintings on top of each other in the midfields, surrounded by pilasters. The images represent (from below) the Last Supper, together with the Crucifixion and the Resurrection of Jesus.  The present reconstructed pulpit is from 1956, following the suggestion of architect Bjarne Hvoslef  (1890-1989).  The church organ dates from 2003 and was built by Orgelbau Kuhn.  The three church bells were cast by Olsen Nauen Bell Foundry; two in 1885 and one in 1898.

Notable ministers 
Nicolai Wergeland (1817)
Eilert Sundt (1869–1875)

References

External links 
 Official website

Churches in Viken
Stone churches in Norway
12th-century churches in Norway